Syed Ghulam Naseeruddin Naseer  (14 November 1949 – 13 February 2009) was a Pakistani poet and Islamic scholar of the Chishti Sufi order. He was the custodian of the Golra Sharif shrine in the Islamabad Capital Territory of Pakistan. Naseeruddin Naseer was the great-grandson of Meher Ali Shah of Golra Sharif and the son of Syed Ghulam Moinuddin Gilani. He is the nephew of Shah Abdul Haq Gilani. Thousands of people attended his funeral ceremony.

Ghulam Naseeruddin was a religious scholar and poet. He wrote poetry in Arabic, Urdu, Punjabi, Persian and many other languages and authored 36 books on Islam, the Quran, Hadith and Fiqh and Prophet Muhammad. He played an important role in spreading the message of Islam in the Potohar region.

Books

His books include:
 Lafz-i-Allah kee Tahqiq
 Kia Iblees Alim Thaa 
 Pakistan mein Zalzaley ke Tabahkarian 
 Musalmaanoon ke Urooj-o-Zawal kay Asbab 
 Quran Majid key Aadab-i-Tilawat’ 
 Mawazna-i-Ilm-o-Karamat
 Faiz e Nisbat
 Fatwa Naveesi ke aadab
 Peeran E Peer ki shakhsiyat, seerat, taleemat
 Aaena Shareeat mein Peeri mureedi ki hesiyat
Tareeq Ul Falah Fi Mas’alatil Kufwi Li’Nikah.

Death
Naseeruddin died on 13 February 2009 at the age of 59. He suffered a massive heart attack and was shifted to a private hospital but died before being provided any medical aid on 8 Safar 1430.

References

Pakistani Sufi religious leaders
Sufi poets
1949 births
2009 deaths
Chishtis
Pakistani Sufis
20th-century Muslim scholars of Islam
21st-century Muslim scholars of Islam
20th-century Pakistani poets
21st-century Pakistani poets
Sunni Sufis